Charles Burguet (26 May 1878 – 9 June 1946) was a French director best known for his silent films of the late 1910s and early 1920s.

He directed well over 30 films between 1912 and 1929.

Selected filmography 
 The Mysteries of Paris (1922)
 Montmartre (1925)
 Barocco (1925)
 Martyr (1927)
 The Veil Dancer (1929)

References

Bibliography

External links 
 

French film directors
Silent film directors
French male screenwriters
20th-century French screenwriters
1878 births
1946 deaths
20th-century French male writers